The 1968 Wisconsin Badgers football team represented the University of Wisconsin in the 1968 Big Ten Conference football season. The team was led by second-year head coach John Coatta, and they competed in the Big Ten Conference. The Badgers finished the season 0–10 (0–7 in Big Ten, last); to date, this is the first (and only) time the Badgers have finished winless.

This was the first season of artificial turf at Camp Randall Stadium; the Tartan Turf home opener was against Washington of the Pac-8, who had just installed AstroTurf at their Husky Stadium in Seattle. Outside of these two, the only other University Division venues with synthetic turf in 1968 were the Astrodome (Houston) and Neyland Stadium (Tennessee).

Schedule

Roster

NFL/AFL Draft selections
Two University of Wisconsin Badgers were selected in the 1969 NFL/AFL draft, which lasted seventeen rounds with 442 selections.

References

Wisconsin
Wisconsin Badgers football seasons
College football winless seasons
Wisconsin Badgers football